Knightquest is a fan film that made its debut on the internet in October 2001, created by fans of the Star Wars franchise. It is a live-action drama set in the Star Wars universe, taking place a few weeks before the events in A New Hope. It depicts Darth Vader's ongoing quest to seek out and destroy any Jedi who may have escaped the great purge years ago.

Knightquest is notable among fanfilms for having been shot on film, as opposed to the more common digital video. It was also mastered in THX Dolby Surround, and features a special Star Wars themed THX introduction before the film.

The film has been generally well received by fans, and has been consistently mentioned in the press as a turning point in the development of fanfilms. The film has also won several awards, including Best Actress and Best Special Effects in the 2001 Force 3.75 Australian Fanfilm Festival.

The film's entire budget of $12,000 went to vendors for camera and equipment rental, film, costume and prop creation, location permits, hotel rooms and food. The entire cast and crew worked for free.

Filming began on October 31, 1998 and lasted four days. Pick-ups were done in December of that year and again in March 1999. Visual effects work continued until right before the film was released in October 2001. Tom Sehenuk was responsible for nearly all visual effects, except for lightsaber rotoscoping, which was completed by Clay Kronke.

Plot 
Smuggler Tara Sunarr and her droid Chee-2A have been sold out of supplies for the Jedi Master Ulic Cinn and have been tracked down by the Empire. After narrowly, but albeit temporarily losing her pursuers, Tara informs Ulic of this. Realizing the time he has feared has finally arrived, Ulic informs his students, Jedi siblings Karina and Dannikk, that they must escape before their existence is discovered.

An attack force led by Darth Vader arrives on the planet in search of the Jedi. Vader dispatches Captain Alder to eliminate Tara, while he deals with the Jedi himself. Karina comes to Tara’s rescue, eliminates the Stormtroopers and sends Alder into a full retreat.

Vader finds Ulic and offers him the chance to join him, but the Jedi ignites his yellow blade. Despite his best efforts, Ulic is no match for Vader. However, Dannikk appears to help him, causing Vader to struggle. Karina senses Dannikk is in trouble and rushes back to him. Ulic is struck down by Vader, but  his body vanishes from existence. Vader offers Dannikk the chance to be his apprentice, which Dannikk seems to consider as he looks at his fallen master. Karina appears and the sight of her allows Dannikk to gain control of himself again. He attacks again but his cut in two, in front of a horrified Karina, who runs to a high cliff.

Tara and Chee-2A escape the planet and are able to lose their pursuers. Vader follows Karina all the way to the cliff, where they duel. Karina holds her own, but Vader eventually disarms her. Vader force chokes Karina and holds her at the edge of the cliff, taunting her of Ulic’s failure to protect her. Desperately trying to free herself, Karina resists and Vader throws he over the side. Vader and Alder depart the planet.

Karina survives the fall, having been trained to do so for many years. She builds resting spots for Ulic and Dannikk and promises to avenge them without falling to the Dark Side to do so.

Cast 
 Doria Anselmo ... Karina
 Forest G. Wood ... Ulic Cinn
 Daniel Schneidermann ... Dannikk and Stormtrooper
 Michelle O'Keefe ... Tara Sunarr
 Matt Howell ... Captain Alder and Voice of Chee-2A
 Tom Sehenuk ... Darth Vader
 Ben Fletcher ... Voice of Darth Vader
 Bryan Winchester ... Stormtrooper

External links 
 
 Knightquest at TheForce.Net
 Article in The Weekly Standard
 Review by Adam Bertocci

2001 films
2001 independent films
Fan films based on Star Wars
American independent films
2000s English-language films
2000s American films